Robert Sandnes (born 29 December 1991) is a retired Norwegian football defender who last played for Aalesund.

He also played for three Icelandic clubs as well as Start from 2014 to 2016.

Career statistics

References

 Player profile - IK Start
 

1991 births
Living people
Sportspeople from Ålesund
Norwegian footballers
Aalesunds FK players
Roberd Sandnes
IK Start players
Eliteserien players
Norwegian First Division players
Stjarnan players
Knattspyrnufélag Reykjavíkur players
Association football defenders
Norwegian expatriate footballers
Expatriate footballers in Iceland
Norwegian expatriate sportspeople in Iceland